Milka Maneva (Bulgarian: Милка Манева; born 7 June 1985 in Smolyan, Bulgaria) is a Bulgarian weightlifter. She won the silver medal in the Women's 63 kg category at the 2012 Summer Olympics. She originally finished fifth, but was promoted to second after Maiya Maneza, Svetlana Tsarukayeva, and Sibel Şimşek were all disqualified.

Maneva also qualified for the 2008 Summer Olympics but she was one of eleven Bulgarian weightlifters to test positive for a banned steroid two months prior to the games. Bulgaria withdrew its whole team from the Olympic competition and Maneva received a four-year ban from competition.

References

1985 births
Living people
Olympic weightlifters of Bulgaria
Olympic silver medalists for Bulgaria
Weightlifters at the 2012 Summer Olympics
Doping cases in weightlifting
Bulgarian female weightlifters
People from Smolyan
Olympic medalists in weightlifting
Medalists at the 2012 Summer Olympics
20th-century Bulgarian women
21st-century Bulgarian women